Arturo Hammersley (21 May 1922 – 1 September 2014) was a Chilean alpine skier. He competed at the 1948 Winter Olympics and the 1956 Winter Olympics.

References

1922 births
2014 deaths
Chilean male alpine skiers
Olympic alpine skiers of Chile
Alpine skiers at the 1948 Winter Olympics
Alpine skiers at the 1956 Winter Olympics
Sportspeople from Valparaíso
20th-century Chilean people